Lucie Myslivečková (born 8 December 1989) is a Czech and Slovak former competitive ice dancer. Representing Slovakia with Lukáš Csölley, she competed at the 2018 Winter Olympics in Pyeongchang, South Korea. Earlier in her career, she represented the Czech Republic with Matěj Novák and Neil Brown. With Novák, she is the 2010 Golden Spin of Zagreb champion and the 2011 Czech national champion.

Personal life 
Myslivečková was born on 8 December 1989 in Čeladná. She became a Slovak citizen in December 2017.

Career 
Myslivečková started learning to skate in 1994.

With Novák 
Myslivečková teamed up with Matěj Novák in 2005. At the end of September, they began representing the Czech Republic on the ISU Junior Grand Prix (JGP) circuit. The two made their senior international debut in September 2007 at the Nebelhorn Trophy before winning the silver medal at the 2007 JGP in Sheffield, England. In November, they took the senior bronze medal at the Pavel Roman Memorial.

Myslivečková/Novák were awarded the bronze medal at the 2008 JGP in Courchevel, France. In February 2009, they competed in Sofia, Bulgaria, at their fourth consecutive World Junior Championships, finishing 8th. A month later, they appeared at their first senior ISU Championship, placing 21st at the 2009 World Championships in Los Angeles.

Myslivečková/Novák made their senior Grand Prix debut the following season, finishing 7th at the 2009 Cup of Russia and 9th at the 2009 NHK Trophy. They missed part of the season due to her broken elbow. The two ranked 16th at the 2010 World Championships in Turin, Italy.

During the 2010–11 season, they won silver at the Ondrej Nepela Memorial, finished 6th at the NHK Trophy and 5th at the Cup of Russia. They won their first international title at the 2010 Golden Spin of Zagreb. At the end of the season, Novák decided to leave competitive skating.

Later partnerships 
Myslivečková teamed up with French ice dancer Neil Brown in the summer of 2011. Representing the Czech Republic, the two won the bronze medal at the 2012 Bavarian Open, silver at the 2012 Ice Challenge, and bronze at the 2013 International Trophy of Lyon, in addition to two national titles.

Myslivečková/Brown competed at three European Championships, achieving their highest placement, 14th, at the 2013 Europeans in Zagreb, Croatia. Ranked 21st in the short dance, they just missed qualifying for the final segment at the 2013 World Championships in London, Ontario, Canada. Their final competition together was the Bavarian Open in February 2014.

Myslivečková briefly partnered with Czech single skater Pavel Kaška but they did not compete internationally. After undergoing surgery for a ligament tear in her knee, followed by six months of rest, she became a coach in Norway.

2016–2017 season: First season with Csölley 
Slovakia's Lukáš Csölley contacted Myslivečková on Skype after his previous partner ended her career. They teamed up in late June 2016 and announced on 11 July 2016 that they would compete together for Slovakia. During their first season together, they were coached by Roberto Pelizzola and Paola Mezzadri in Milan, Italy.

Myslivečková/Csölley won gold at the Volvo Open Cup in November 2016 and placed 16th at the 2017 European Championships in Ostrava, Czech Republic. In mid-March 2017, they decided to withdraw from the World Championships in Helsinki due to Myslivečková's shoulder injury, requiring an operation.

2017–2018 season: 2018 Winter Olympics 
During the season, Myslivečková/Csölley trained under Barbara Fusar-Poli, Stefano Caruso, and Roberto Pelizzolla in Milan, Italy. In late September, the duo competed at the 2017 CS Nebelhorn Trophy, the final qualifying opportunity for the 2018 Winter Olympics. Their result, 6th, was sufficient to obtain an Olympic spot for Slovakia, by 0.27 of a point. In January, they placed 17th at the 2018 European Championships in Moscow, Russia.

In February, the two competed at the 2018 Winter Olympics in Pyeongchang, South Korea. They qualified to the free dance and finished 20th overall. In March, they placed 25th at the 2018 World Championships in Milan, Italy.

Programs

With Csölley

With Brown

With Novák

Competitive highlights 
GP: Grand Prix; CS: Challenger Series; JGP: Junior Grand Prix

With Csölley for Slovakia

With Brown for the Czech Republic

With Novák for the Czech Republic

References

External links 

 
 
 
 
 
 

Czech female ice dancers
1989 births
Living people
People from Frýdek-Místek District
Naturalized citizens of Slovakia
Figure skaters at the 2018 Winter Olympics
Olympic figure skaters of Slovakia
Slovak female ice dancers
Naturalised sports competitors